The Bensen Aircraft Corporation was established by Dr. Igor Bensen at Raleigh-Durham International Airport in North Carolina in 1952 to develop and market a variety of helicopters and autogyros of Bensen's own design.

History
The most successful product was the Bensen B-8 that first flew in 1955 and remained in production until the company closed down in 1987.

Aircraft

See also

 Gyrocopter
 Gyroglider

References

Notes

Bibliography

External links 

Bensen Aircraft Foundation archives

Defunct aircraft manufacturers of the United States
Defunct helicopter manufacturers of the United States
Defunct manufacturing companies based in North Carolina
Manufacturing companies established in 1952